Mairjimmy is a rural community in the central south part of the Riverina.  It is situated by road, about 17 kilometres south east of Jerilderie and 20 kilometres north west of Berrigan.

Mairjimmy Football Club entered the Southern Riverina Football Association for one season only in 1917.

References

External links

Towns in the Riverina
Towns in New South Wales
Murrumbidgee Council